Hypocreomycetidae is a subclass of sac fungi.

Orders
As accepted by Wijayawardene et al. 2020.
Cancellidiales - Cancellidiaceae (2 genera)

Conioscyphales - Conioscyphaceae (1)

Coronophorales 
 Bertiaceae (2)
 Ceratostomataceae (16)
 Chaetosphaerellaceae (3)
 Coronophoraceae (1)
 Nitschkiaceae (13)
 Scortechiniaceae (11)

Falcocladiales - Falcocladiaceae (1)

Fuscosporellales - Fuscosporellaceae (6)

Glomerellales
 Australiascaceae (1)
 Glomerellaceae (1)
 Malaysiascaceae (1)
 Plectosphaerellaceae (24)
 Reticulascaceae (4)

Hypocreales
 Bionectriaceae (47)
 Calcarisporiaceae (1)
 Clavicipitaceae (50)
 Cocoonihabitaceae (1)
 Cordycipitaceae (21)
 Cylindriaceae (1)
 Flammocladiellaceae (1)
 Hypocreaceae (17)
 Myrotheciomycetaceae (4)
 Nectriaceae (70)
 Niessliaceae (21)
 Ophiocordycipitaceae (12)
 Sarocladiaceae (2)
 Stachybotryaceae (39)
 Tilachlidiaceae (3)

Jobellisiales - Jobellisiaceae (1)

Koralionastetales - Koralionastetaceae (2)

Lulworthiales - Lulworthiaceae (16)

Microascales (Halosphaeriales)
 Ceratocystidaceae (11)
 Chadefaudiellaceae (2)
 Gondwanamycetaceae (2)
 Graphiaceae (1)
 Halosphaeriaceae (68)
 Microascaceae (23)
 Triadelphiaceae (2)

Pararamichloridiales - Pararamichloridiaceae (1)

Parasympodiellales - Parasympodiellaceae (1)

Pisorisporiales - Pisorisporiaceae (2)

Pleurotheciales - Pleurotheciaceae (14)

Savoryellales - Savoryellaceae (6)

Spathulosporales
 Hispidicarpomycetaceae (1)
 Spathulosporaceae (2)

Torpedosporales
 Etheirophoraceae (2)
 Juncigenaceae (6)
 Torpedosporaceae (1)

Incertae sedis genera

 Ascocodinaea
 Conioscypha
 Conioscyphascus
 Etheirophora
 Porosphaerellopsis

References

Sordariomycetes
Fungus subclasses
Taxa described in 1997